Aardvark Jazz Orchestra is an eclectic big band founded in 1973 by bandleader and trumpeter Mark Harvey. The orchestra plays music from across the jazz tradition with specialties in Ellingtonia and the original postmodern compositions of music director Mark Harvey. The group has won various awards, including one for Jazz Song at The 1st Annual Independent Music Awards ("Scamology"), and has released at least eight albums since 1993.

Musicians
For Aardvark's 2018 Christmas concert, the musicians performing were:

Sax/Woodwinds
Arni Cheatham
Peter H. Bloom
Phil Scarff
Chris Rakowski
Dan Zupan

Trumpets
K.C. Dunbar
Jeanne Snodgrass
Mark Harvey

Trombones & Tuba
Bob Pilkington
Jay Keyser
Jeff Marsanskis
Bill Lowe

Rhythm
Richard Nelson - Guitar
John Funkhouser - Bass, Piano
Harry Wellott - Drums

Vocals
Grace Hughes
Jerry Edwards

Discography
Aardvark Steps Out (1993, Nine Winds)
Paintings for Jazz Orchestra (1995, Leo Lab)
An Aardvark Christmas (1997, Nine Winds)
Psalms & Elegies (1997, Leo)
The Seeker (2000, Leo)
Duke Ellington/Sacred Music (2003, Aardmuse)
Bethlehem Counterpoint (2003, Aardmuse)
Trumpet Madness (2005, Leo)
No Walls/A Christmas Concert (2007, Aardmuse)

See also
List of experimental big bands

References

Progressive big bands
Experimental big bands
Independent Music Awards winners
Leo Records artists